The 1908 United States presidential election in Kansas was held on November 3, 1908 as part of the 1908 United States presidential election. Kansas voters chose ten electors to the Electoral College, who voted for president and vice president.

In its first thirty years as a state Kansas had been powerfully Republican, but with the Populist movement and major agricultural crises the state turned to James B. Weaver in 1892 and William Jennings Bryan in 1896; however, President William McKinley won a rematch with Bryan in 1900. With the return to a conservative “Gold Democrat” candidate in 1904, Kansas reverted to rock-solid Republican as Alton B. Parker failed to carry a single county in the state against Theodore Roosevelt.

Bryan was nominated as the Democratic candidate for president for the third time. However, by October, most predictions suggested that Bryan would not win over the voters who had deserted Parker, and be unsuccessful in his attempt to emulate his “Commoner” success of 1896.

On election day, Taft carried Kansas by 9.60%, an improvement of over 2% upon McKinley's 1900 result and of 13.26% upon the Republican result from 1896, despite Bryan campaigning in the state at the beginning of November. HIs underperformance was in part attributed to the fact that Kansas’ local Republicans supported Taft's plan to guarantee bank deposits for all customers through the state treasurer.

As of 2020, this remains the last time that Kansas has voted for a different presidential candidate than neighboring Nebraska.

Full results

Results by county

See also
 United States presidential elections in Kansas

References

Kansas
1908